Cynwyl Elfed is an electoral ward, representing the communities of Bronwydd, Cynwyl Elfed and Llanpumpsaint, Carmarthenshire, Wales.

Profile
In 2014, the Cynwyl Elfed electoral ward had an electorate of 2,550. The total population was 2,985, of whom 66.0% were born in Wales. The 2011 census indicated that 54.3% of the population were able to speak Welsh.

A 2019 boundary review by the Local Government Boundary Commission for Wales recommended the Newchurch and Merthyr community be removed from Cynwyl Elfed and added to the neighbouring Trelech ward. The change was to take effect from the May 2022 local elections.

Current Representation
Cynwyl Elfed is a single-member ward for the purposes of Carmarthenshire County Council elections. Since 2012 it has been represented by Independent councillor Irfon Jones.

External links

References

Carmarthenshire electoral wards